Macklem is a surname. Notable people with the surname include:

 Peter Macklem (1931–2011), Canadian doctor, medical researcher, and hospital administrator
 Tiff Macklem (born 1961), Canadian banker and economist

See also
 Mackler